The 2016 Algarve Football Cup was a summer football friendly tournament. It was hosted at the Estádio Algarve in the Algarve in Portugal, between the 14 and 16 July 2016. It involved Benfica and Vitória de Setúbal of the Portuguese Primeira Liga and English Championship side Derby County.

Overview

Participants

Standings
Each team will play two matches, with three points awarded for a win, one point for a draw, and zero points for a defeat. In the first two matches of the 2016 Algarve Football Cup, a penalty shoot-out took place afterwards. That's despite Vitória de Setúbal beating Derby County in Game 2. A shoot-out did not take place after Benfica's match against Derby.

Matches

Goalscorers

Media coverage

References

2016–17 in English football
2016–17 in Portuguese football